The Great Miami Rowing Center (GMRC) is a non-profit 501(c)(3) rowing community founded in 2006. Located in historic downtown Hamilton, Ohio, GMRC was started as part of Hamilton Vision 2020, a broader initiative, which "encompasses many aspirations and dimensions, but its main goal has been to design a framework for action that serves as a dynamic and living plan for our City."

GMRC hosts teams for youth, collegiate, and masters rowers. The center also provides classes to the public.

References

Further reading

External links 
 
 Hamilton 2020

Rowing organizations
Charities based in Ohio
Organizations established in 2006
2006 establishments in Ohio